Hellinsia angulofuscus is a moth of the family Pterophoridae. It is found in Argentina (Salta), Brazil (São Paulo) and Paraguay (Asuncion).

The wingspan is 16‑17 mm. The forewings are creamy‑white. There is a faint, oblique spot before the base of the cleft and a costal dash above the base of the cleft and a distinct spot at the anal angle of the first lobe. The hindwings are grey‑white. Adults are on wing in April and June.

The larvae feed on Wulffia baccata.

References

Moths described in 1991
angulofuscus
Pterophoridae of South America
Fauna of Brazil
Fauna of Paraguay
Moths of South America